West-Rügen is an Amt in the district of Vorpommern-Rügen, in Mecklenburg-Vorpommern, Germany. The seat of the Amt is in Samtens.

The Amt West-Rügen consists of the following municipalities:
Altefähr
Dreschvitz
Gingst
Insel Hiddensee
Kluis
Neuenkirchen
Rambin
Samtens
Schaprode
Trent
Ummanz

Ämter in Mecklenburg-Western Pomerania
Rügen